Iscotrizinol (USAN, INCI diethylhexyl butamido triazone) is an organic compound used in sunscreens to absorb UVB and some UVA radiation  with a peak protection at 310 nm. It is one of the most photostable chemical sunscreens known today with 25 hours required to lose 10% of its SPF protection ability. It is marketed as Uvasorb HEB by 3V Sigma.

References

Sunscreening agents
Triazines
Aromatic amines
4-Aminobenzoate esters
Benzamides
Tert-butyl compounds